

The Estonian Declaration of Independence, also known as the Manifesto to the Peoples of Estonia, is the founding act which established the independent democratic Republic of Estonia on 24 February 1918. Since then the 24 February has been celebrated as the Estonian Independence Day, the national day of Estonia.

The declaration was drafted by the Salvation Committee which had been elected by the elders of the Estonian Provincial Assembly (Maapäev). Originally intended to be formally announced on 21 February 1918, the proclamation was delayed until the evening of 23 February, when the manifesto was printed and read out aloud publicly in Pärnu. On the next day, 24 February, the manifesto was printed and distributed in the capital, Tallinn.

Historical context 
During World War I, on 24 February 1918, in the Estonian capital Tallinn (Reval), between retreating Bolshevik Russian and advancing German troops (and the nearing occupation by the German Empire), the Estonian Salvation Committee — the executive body of the democratically elected Estonian Provincial Assembly (Maapäev) — declared the independence of Estonia. The German Empire did not recognise the newly declared Republic of Estonia. However, after the defeat of the Central Powers in World War I in November 1918, Germany withdrew its troops from Estonia, and formally handed power in Estonia over to the Estonian Provisional Government on 19 November 1918. 

In the following 1918–1920 War of Independence, Estonians were able to repel the Bolshevik Russian invasion and successfully defended their newborn freedom. The Republic of Estonia obtained international recognition and became a member of the League of Nations in 1921.

Full text of the Declaration

===Manifesto to the peoples of Estonia===

Never in the course of centuries have the Estonian people lost their ardent desire for independence. From generation to generation the secret hope has endured in Estonians that despite the dark night of servitude and violent rule by foreign peoples the time will come in Estonia "when all splinters, at both end, will burst forth into flames" and when "Kalev will reach home to bring his children happiness."

Now is the time.

An unheard-of struggle of nations has destroyed the rotten foundations of the Russian tsarist state. All over the Sarmatian plains ruinous anarchy is spreading, threatening to overwhelm in its wake all peoples living within the borders of the former Russian state. From the West the victorious armies of Germany are approaching in order to claim their share of Russia's inheritance and, first of all, to take over the coastal lands by the Baltic Sea.

In this fateful hour the Estonian Maapäev, as the legal representative of our land and people, has, in unanimous agreement with Estonian democratic political parties and organizations, and by virtue of the right of self-determination of peoples, found it necessary to take the following decisive steps to shape the destiny of Estonian land and people: 

Estonia, within her historical and ethnographic boundaries, is declared as of today 
an independent democratic republic.

The independent republic of Estonia shall include Harjumaa, Läänemaa, Järvamaa, Virumaa with the city of Narva and its surroundings, Tartumaa, Võrumaa, Viljandimaa, and Pärnumaa with the Baltic islands of Saaremaa, Hiiumaa, Muhumaa, and others where Estonians have settled for ages in large majority. Final determination of the boundaries of the republic in the areas bordering on Latvia and Russia will be carried out by plebiscite after the conclusion of the current world war.

In the aforementioned areas the only highest and administrative authority is the democratic rule of the Estonian Salvation Committee established by Estonian Maapäev.

The republic of Estonia wishes to maintain absolute political neutrality towards all sovereign states and peoples and at the same time certainly hopes that they will equally respond with complete neutrality.

The Estonian military forces shall be reduced to the extent necessary to maintain internal order. Estonian soldiers serving in the Russian military forces will be called home and demobilized.

Until the Estonian Constituent Assembly, elected by general, direct, secret, and proportional elections, will convene and determine the constitutional structure of the country, all executive and legislative authority will remain vested in the Estonian Maapäev and in the Estonian Provisional Government created by it, whose activities must be guided by the following principles:

1. All citizens of the Republic of Estonia, irrespective of their religion, ethnic origin, and political views, shall enjoy equal protection under the law and courts of justice of the Republic.
2. Ethnic minorities residing within the borders of the Republic – Russians, Germans, Swedes, Jews, and others – shall be guaranteed their rights to cultural autonomy.
3. All civic freedoms, such at the freedom of expression, of the press, of religion, of assembly, of association, and the freedom to strike as well as the inviolability of the individual and the home, shall be irrefutably effective within the territory of the Republic of Estonia and based on laws which the Government shall immediately work out.
4. The Provisional Government will be charged with the immediate organization of the courts of justice to protect the security of the citizens. All political prisoners shall be released immediately.
5. The city, county, and township local governments will be called upon to continue their work which has been violently interrupted.
6. For maintenance of public order, people's militia, subordinated to local governments, shall be immediately organized and citizens' self-defence organizations established in the cities and rural areas.
7. The Provisional Government in instructed to work out without delay, on a broad democratic basis, bills for the solution of the agrarian problem, and the problems of labor, of food supply, and of finances.

Estonia! You stand on the threshold of a hopeful future where you can freely and independently decide and lead your own destiny. Start building the home of your own, where order and justice would rule, to be a worthy member within the family of civilized nations! All sons and daughters of homeland, let us unite as one man in the sacred task of building our homeland! The sweat and blood shed by our ancestors for this land require it, our descendant generations oblige us to do it.

May God watch over Thee
And amply bless
Whatever thou undertake
My dear homeland!

Long live the independent democratic republic of Estonia!

Long live peace among nations!

The Council of Elders of the Estonian Maapäev
In Tallinn, on 21 February 1918

See also 

 Independence Day (Estonia)
 Estonian War of Independence

References

External links 
 Estonian Declaration of Independence, 24 February 1918 at www.president.ee
 February 24 — Estonia's Independence Day! at Visit Estonia

1918 in Estonia
Declarations of independence
Independence of Estonia
February 1918 events
1918 documents
1918 in international relations
Dissolution of the Russian Empire